Partymobile is the third studio album by Canadian singer PartyNextDoor. It was released on March 27, 2020, by OVO Sound and Warner Records.

Release and promotion
In November 2019, PartyNextDoor announced his third studio album would be released in January 2020. The album's release was then pushed back to February. The album was delayed for a second time before being released to streaming services on March 27, 2020.

Commercial performance
Partymobile debuted at number eight on the US Billboard 200 chart, earning 50,000 album-equivalent units in its first week. This became Party's second US top-ten debut.

Critical reception 

Partymobile received mixed reviews from music critics. Adrienne Harmony from Exclaim! noted, "beyond these, though, there's a lot on Partymobile that simply comes and goes. A surprising turn for such a memorable artist." Scott Glaysher from HipHopDX rated Partymobile a 3.7 out of 5, stating, "as society gets deeper into this unprecedented quarantine, the masses will have more time on their own to sit and long for intimate relationships and Party's isolation anthems are a source of solace."

Track listing
Credits adapted from Tidal.

Notes
  signifies a co-producer
 "Savage Anthem" features additional vocals by Poo Bear

Charts

Weekly charts

Year-end charts

References

2020 albums
OVO Sound albums
PartyNextDoor albums
Warner Records albums
Albums produced by OG Parker